The Corner is a lost 1916 film western written by C. Gardner Sullivan and starring George Fawcett and Willard Mack. One of the extras is then unknown John Gilbert.

Cast
 George Fawcett as David Waltham
 Willard Mack as John Adams
 Clara Williams as Mrs. Adams
 Louise Brownell as Mrs. Waltham
 Charles F. Miller as Rent Collector
 John Gilbert as Extra (uncredited)
 Thelma Salter as Little Girl (uncredited)

References

External links 

 

1916 films
1916 Western (genre) films
American black-and-white films
Films directed by Walter Edwards
Silent American Western (genre) films
1910s American films
1910s English-language films